There have been women in the United States Space Force since the branch's inception in 2019. It is the only branch of the United States military where women have always had equal roles.

On 23 July 2020 the Space Force obtained its first all-female space operations crew. On 17 August of that year Nina M. Armagno became the first female Air Force general officer to transfer to the Space Force and the first female general officer in the Space Force. On 1 October of the same year Taryn Stys and Karmann-Monique Pogue were each promoted to chief master sergeant, making them the first women in the Space Force to attain the rank. DeAnna Burt became the first major general in the Space Force after transferring from the Air Force on 7 May 2021.

Air Force Major General Clinton E. Crosier, who is also the United States Space Force’s director of planning, has stated that the Space Force is looking for new policies to create a culture of equality and inclusion.

List of women general officers in the United States Space Force

 Lt Gen Nina Armagno
 Maj Gen DeAnna Burt

See also
 Women in the military
 Women in the United States Air Force
 United States Space Force

References

Women in the United States military